Doʻstlik is an urban-type settlement in Surxondaryo Region, Uzbekistan. It is part of Denov District. The town population in 1999 was 3,400 people.

References

Populated places in Surxondaryo Region
Urban-type settlements in Uzbekistan